The 1981 October Revolution Parade took place on Moscow's Red Square on November 7, 1981, and was dedicated to the 64th anniversary of the October Revolution. General Secretary Leonid Brezhnev was among the high-ranking party members who attended the parade. Taking the salute was Dmitry Ustinov, Minister of Defense of the USSR and Marshal of the Soviet Union. Commanding the parade was Petr Lushev, commander of the Moscow Military District. The music was performed by the Combined Orchestra of the Moscow Garrison and conducted by Major General Nikolai Mikhailov.

See also 
 October Revolution
 Public holidays in the Soviet Union
 1975 October Revolution Parade

References 

October Revolution parades
October Revolution Parade
November 1981 events in Europe
1981 in Moscow